The United States Secret Service uses code names for U.S. presidents, first ladies, and other prominent persons and locations. The use of such names was originally for security purposes and dates to a time when sensitive electronic communications were not routinely encrypted; today, the names simply serve for purposes of brevity, clarity, and tradition. The Secret Service does not choose these names, however. The White House Communications Agency maintains a list that candidates choose from, often choosing ones that resonate with them personally.

According to an established protocol, good codewords are unambiguous words that can be easily pronounced and readily understood by those who transmit and receive voice messages by radio or telephone regardless of their native language. Traditionally, all family members' code names start with the same letter.

The codenames change over time for security purposes, but are often publicly known. For security, codenames are generally picked from a list of such 'good' words, but avoiding the use of common words which could likely be intended to mean their normal definitions.

Presidents and their families
 Woodrow Wilson
 Edith Wilson – Grandma
 Franklin D. Roosevelt
 Eleanor Roosevelt – Rover
 Harry S. Truman – General or Supervise
 Bess Truman – Sunnyside
 Dwight Eisenhower – Scorecard or Providence
 Mamie Eisenhower – Springtime
 David Eisenhower – Sahara
 John F. Kennedy – Lancer
 Jacqueline Kennedy – Lace
 Caroline Kennedy – Lyric
 John F. Kennedy, Jr. – Lark
 Rose Kennedy – Coppertone
 Ethel Kennedy – Sundance
 Lyndon Johnson – Volunteer
 Lady Bird Johnson – Victoria
 Lynda Bird Johnson – Velvet
 Luci Baines Johnson – Venus
 Richard Nixon – Searchlight
 Pat Nixon – Starlight
 Patricia Nixon Cox – Sugarfoot
 Edward F. Cox – Seminole
 Julie Nixon Eisenhower – Sunbonnet
 Gerald Ford – Passkey or Pass Key
 Betty Ford – Pinafore
 Susan Ford – Panda
 Michael Ford – Professor
 Jack Ford – Packman
 Jimmy Carter – Dasher which was changed  to Deacon or Lock Master
 Rosalynn Carter – Lotus Petal or Dancer
 Amy Carter – Dynamo
 Chip Carter – Diamond
 Jack Carter – Derby
 Jeff Carter – Deckhand
 Ronald Reagan – Rawhide
 Nancy Reagan – Rainbow
 Maureen Reagan – Rhyme, Rosebud
 Michael Reagan – Riddler
 Patti Davis – Ribbon
 Ron Reagan – Reliant
 Doria Reagan – Radiant
 George H. W. Bush – Timberwolf
 Barbara Bush – Snowbank or Tranquility
 Marvin Bush – Tuner
 Neil Bush – Trapline
 Jeb Bush – Tripper
 Dorothy Bush – Tiller
 Bill Clinton – Eagle
 Hillary Clinton – Evergreen
 Chelsea Clinton – Energy
 George W. Bush – Tumbler, later Trailblazer
 Laura Bush – Tempo
 Barbara Bush – Turquoise
 Jenna Bush – Twinkle
 Barack Obama – Renegade
 Michelle Obama – Renaissance
 Malia Obama – Radiance
 Sasha Obama – Rosebud
 Marian Shields Robinson – Raindance
 Donald Trump – Mogul
 Melania Trump – Muse
 Donald Trump Jr. – Mountaineer
 Ivanka Trump – Marvel
 Eric Trump – Marksman
 Jared Kushner – Mechanic
 Joe Biden – Celtic
 Jill Biden – Capri

Vice presidents and their families
 Spiro Agnew – Pathfinder
 Judy Agnew – Photograph
 Nelson Rockefeller – Sandstorm
 Happy Rockefeller – Shooting Star or Stardust
 Walter Mondale – Cavalier
 Joan Mondale – Cameo
 Ted Mondale – Centurion
 Eleanor Mondale – Calico
 William Mondale – Chessman
 Dan Quayle – Scorecard or Supervisor
 Marilyn Quayle – Sunshine

 Al Gore – Sundance or Sawhorse
 Tipper Gore – Skylark
 Karenna Gore – Smurfette
 Kristin Gore – Silhouette
 Sarah Gore – Screwdriver
 Albert Gore III – Shortstop
 Dick Cheney – Angler
 Lynne Cheney – Author
 Elizabeth Cheney – Apollo
 Mary Cheney – Alpine
 Mike Pence – Hoosier
 Karen Pence – Hummingbird
 Kamala Harris – Pioneer
 Doug Emhoff – TBA

Political candidates and their spouses
U.S. Secret Service codenames are often given to high-profile political candidates (such as presidential and vice presidential candidates), and their respective families and spouses who are assigned U.S. Secret Service protection. These codenames often differ from those held if they are elected or those from prior periods if they held positions needing codenames.

1968
 Eugene McCarthy – Instructor

1972
 George McGovern – Redwood

1976
 Jimmy Carter – Dasher or Deacon
 Bob Dole – Ramrod
 Elizabeth Dole – Rainbow
 Morris Udall – Dashboard

1980
 John B. Anderson – Miracle, Starburst or Stardust
 Keke Anderson – Scarlet
 George H. W. Bush – Sheepskin (During 1980 Campaign) 
 Phil Crane – Swordfish
 Ted Kennedy – Sunburn

1984
 Geraldine Ferraro – Duster
 John Zaccaro – N/A (Declined Secret Service Protection)
 John Glenn – Iron
 Jesse Jackson – Thunder
 Walter Mondale – Dragon

1988
 Lloyd Bentsen – Parthenon
 Michael Dukakis – Peso
 Kitty Dukakis – Panda
 Jesse Jackson – Pontiac
 Gary Hart – Redwood
 Paul Simon – Scarlett

1996
 Bob Dole – Patriot
 Elizabeth Dole – Pioneer
 Jack Kemp – Champion
 Joanne Kemp – Cornerstone

2000
 Joe Lieberman – Laser
 Hadassah Lieberman – Liberty

2004
 John Kerry – Minuteman
 Teresa Heinz Kerry – Mahogany
 John Edwards – Speedway

2008
 John McCain – Phoenix
 Cindy McCain – Parasol
 Meghan McCain – Peter Sellers (Peter)
 John Sidney McCain IV – Popeye
 Bridget McCain – Pebbles
 Sarah Palin – Denali
 Todd Palin – Driller

2012 
 Mitt Romney – Javelin
 Ann Romney – Jockey
 Rick Santorum – Petrus
 Newt Gingrich – T-Rex
 Paul Ryan – Bowhunter
 Janna Ryan – Buttercup

2016
 Ben Carson – Eli
 Tim Kaine – Daredevil
 Anne Holton – Dogwood
 Bernie Sanders – Intrepid

2020
 Bernie Sanders – Intrepid
 Donald Trump – Mogul
 Kamala Harris – Pioneer

Government officials
 Kennedy Administration
 Cabinet
 Secretary of State Dean Rusk – Freedom
 Staff
 Rear Adm. George Burkley (Physician to the president) – Market
 Senior military aide General Chester Clifton – Watchman
 Associate Press Secretary Andrew Hatcher – Winner
 Assistant Press Secretary Malcolm Kilduff – Warrior
 Personal secretary Evelyn Lincoln – Willow
 Air Force aide Godfrey McHugh – Wing
 Special assistant and appointments secretary Kenneth O'Donnell – Wand
 Naval aide Captain Tazewell Shepard – Witness
 White House secretary Priscilla Wear – Fiddle
 White House secretary Jill Cowen – Faddle
 Lyndon Johnson Administration
 Staff
 Walter Jenkins – Vigilant
 Pierre Salinger – Wayside
 Nixon Administration
 Cabinet
 Secretary of State and National Security Advisor Henry Kissinger – Woodcutter
 His wife, Nancy Kissinger – Woodlark
 Staff
 White House photographer Ollie Atkins – Hawkeye
 Gulf Coast Regional Chairman James Baker – Fencing Master or Foxtail
 Deputy Assistant to the President Dwight Chapin – Watchdog
 Domestic Affairs Advisor Kenneth Reese Cole Jr. – Spectator
 John Ehrlichman – Wisdom
 White House aide Tim Elbourne – Snapshot
 Secretary of State Alexander Haig – Claw Hammer
 White House Chief of Staff H. R. Haldeman – Welcome
 Assistant to Haldeman Lawrence Higby – Semaphore
 Air Force aide James D. Hughes – Red Barron
 Communications Director Herbert G. Klein – Witness
 Dr. William Lukash (Physician to the president) – Sawhorse
 Senior assistant Clark MacGregor – Whipcrack
 Assistant for Legislative Affairs William Timmons – Windowpane
 Dr. Walter Tkach (Physician to the president) – Signature
 Director of the White House Office of Presidential Advance, later Director of the National Park Service, Ronald H. Walker – Roadrunner
 Personal secretary Rose Mary Woods – Strawberry
 Press Secretary and Assistant to the President Ron Ziegler – Whale Boat
 Presidential spokesman Ken W. Clawson – Thunderstorm
 Ford Administration
 Staff
 Press Secretary Ron Nessen – Clam Chowder
 Deputy Chief of Staff, later Chief of Staff, Dick Cheney – Backseat
 Carter Administration
 Cabinet
 Secretary of State Cyrus Vance – Fade Away
 Secretary of Defense Harold Brown – Finley
 Staff
 National Security Advisor Zbigniew Brzeziński – Hawkeye
 Director of the Office of Management and Budget Bert Lance – Dumbo
 Reagan Administration
 Attorney General William French Smith – Flivver
 Secretary of Education Terrel Bell – Foxcraft
 George W. Bush Administration
 Scott McClellan – Matrix (generic name for White House press secretary)
 Chief of Staff Andy Card – Potomac, later Patriot 
 Chief of Staff Josh Bolten – Fatboy
 Secretary of Labor Elaine Chao – Firebird

 Obama Administration
 Chief of Staff Rahm Emanuel – Black Hawk
 Tim Geithner – Fencing Master (generic codename for Secretary of the Treasury)
 Trump Administration
 Senior Counselor to the President Kellyanne Conway – Blueberry

Congressional officials
 Senator Strom Thurmond (R-South Carolina) – Footprint
 Senator Howard Baker (R-Tennessee) – Snapshot
 Congressman and Speaker of the House Thomas P. "Tip" O'Neill – Flag Day

Other individuals

 Israel
 Prime Minister Menachem Begin – Cedar
 Hasia Begin Milo – Crystal
 Commonwealth Realms
 Queen Elizabeth II – Kittyhawk, Redfern
 King Charles III – Principal or Unicorn
 United States
 Florida banker and businessman, confidant of President Nixon, Bebe Rebozo – Christopher
 Social secretary to First Lady Eleanor Roosevelt, and mistress to President Franklin D. Roosevelt, Lucy Mercer Rutherfurd – Mrs. Johnson
 Legendary singer and actor Frank Sinatra – Napoleon
 Vatican
 Pope John Paul II – Halo

Locations, objects, and places
U.S. Secret Service codenames are not only given to people; they are often given to places, locations and even objects, such as aircraft like Air Force One, and vehicles such as the Presidential State Car.
 Joint Base Andrews, in Prince George's County, Maryland – Acrobat or Andy
 The Presidential Motorcade – Bamboo
 The Harry S Truman Building (Department of State headquarters) – Birds-eye
 Camp David, presidential retreat in Catoctin Mountain Park, in Frederick County, Maryland – Cactus or Buckeye
 The Vice President's office – Cobweb
 The Vice President's staff – Pacemaker
 The Waldorf-Astoria Hotel, New York City – Roadhouse
 Air Force One – Angel or Cowpuncher
 The U.S. Presidential State Car – Stagecoach
 Follow-up car – Halfback
 The White House – Castle (Crown referring to the Executive Mansion, the central representative and office spaces of the White House)
 The Capitol – Punch bowl
 The White House Situation Room – Cement Mixer
 Eisenhower Executive Office Building (part of the White House Complex) – Central
 Reagan National Airport – Curbside
 The temporary residence of the President – Charcoal or Base
 The Pentagon – Calico
 White House garage – Carpet
 J. Edgar Hoover Building (FBI Headquarters) – Cork
 Lyndon Baines Johnson's ranch – Volcano

In fiction

In popular culture, the practice of assigning codenames is often used to provide additional verisimilitude in fictional works about the executive branch, or high-ranking governmental figures.
 1600 Penn
 First Son Standrich "Skip" Gilchrist Jr. – Meatball
 The American President
 President Andrew Shepherd – Liberty
 Chasing Liberty
 First Daughter Anna Foster – Liberty
 Designated Survivor
 President Tom Kirkman – Phoenix formally Glasses (during his time as Secretary of Housing and Urban Development) 
 First Daughter (2004 film)
 First Daughter Samantha Mackenzie – Lucky Charm
 First Kid
 President Paul Davenport – Eagle
 First Son Luke Davenport – Prince
 In the Line of Fire
 The President – Traveler
 Jericho
 President Jon Tomarchio – Condor
 The Prodigal Daughter
 President Florentyna Kane – Baroness
 Scandal
 President Fitzgerald Thomas "Fitz" Grant III – Falcon
 First Lady Melody Margaret "Mellie" Grant – Foxtail
 White House Chief of Staff Abigail "Abby" Whelan – Firebrand
 The Sentinel
 President John Ballentine – Classic
 First Lady Sara Ballentine – Cincinnati
 Squeeze Me
 The President – Mastodon
 The First Lady – Mockingbird
 Tom Clancy's novels

 Unnamed President in Clear and Present Danger – Wrangler
 President Jack Ryan in Debt of Honor and Executive Orders – Swordsman
 Dr. Caroline "Cathy" Ryan in Executive Orders – Surgeon
 Olivia "Sally" Ryan in Executive Orders – Shadow
 Jack Ryan, Jr in Executive Orders – Shortstop
 Katie Ryan in Executive Orders – Sandbox
 Kyle Daniel Ryan in The Bear and the Dragon – Sprite
 George Winston (Secretary of the Treasury) in Executive Orders – Trader
 Benjamin Goodley (National Security Advisor) in Executive Orders – Cardsharp
 Arnold Van Damm (White House Chief of Staff) in Executive Orders and The Bear and the Dragon – Carpenter
 Callie Weston (Chief Speechwriter) in Executive Orders and The Bear and the Dragon – Calliope

 Scott Adler (Secretary of State) in Executive Orders and The Bear and the Dragon – Eagle

 The West Wing
 President Josiah "Jed" Bartlet – Eagle or Liberty
 Zoey Bartlet – Bookbag
 C. J. Cregg – Flamingo
 Sam Seaborn – Princeton
 Gus Westin (grandson of Jed Bartlet) – Tonka
 Arnold Vinick – Big Sur

See also
 00 Agent#Origin of nomenclature
 CIA cryptonym
 List of nicknames of United States Presidents

References

Nicknames
United States Secret Service
United States government secrecy
Code names